Parliamentary elections were held in Nigeria on 25 April 1998. They were the first since 1992, following a coup in 1993. All parties running in the election were affiliated with the military regime, with all opposition parties banned. Voter turnout was very low, and the election results was annulled by the government. Fresh elections were held the following year.

Results

Senate

House of Representatives

References

Nigeria
Parliament
Parliamentary elections in Nigeria
Annulled elections
Election and referendum articles with incomplete results
Parliamentary election